The Tour du Doubs is a single-day road bicycle race, currently held annually in September in the region of Doubs, France. Since 2005, the race is organized as a 1.1 event on the UCI Europe Tour and since 2010 it is part of the French Road Cycling Cup.

Winners 

 

UCI Europe Tour races
Recurring sporting events established in 1934
1934 establishments in France
Cycle races in France